Night Sky is a 1991 play by Susan Yankowitz, which originally premiered in New York starring Joan MacIntosh, under the direction of Joseph Chaikin, whose personal struggles with stroke and aphasia were the original inspiration for the play.  It was later produced Off-Broadway in a revised version under the direction of Daniella Topol and featuring Jordan Baker in the main role.

Plot
The play is set in modern times, and theatrically explores what Dr. Stephen Hawking called the two mysteries remaining to us: the brain and the cosmos.

Anna, a brilliant and articulate astronomer, has her sights set on a promising academic career.  However, her life is suddenly turned upside-down when she is struck by a car and develops aphasia.  Without the ability to effectively communicate, as a "hodge-podge of unconnected words alternately confusing, funny, original and wise – and sometimes all four" becomes her normal pattern of speech, Anna's life becomes increasingly more difficult, in dealing with her lover, a teen-aged daughter, and attempting to continue her professional career.

However, her condition isn't completely irreversible, and it is the process of Anna's harrowing recovery that is the heart of the story.  Along the way, the audience also encounters another aphasia patient, Anna's therapist, and other individuals who misunderstand her condition, all as Anna tries to recover and to deliver her research paper at a prestigious conference in Paris.

Characters
Anna – a brilliant astronomer and the protagonist of the play.
Jen – Anna's teen-aged daughter, struggling with her own issues with growing up.
Daniel – Anna's love interest, an aspiring opera singer.
Bill – Anna's colleague, another astronomer with the university.

Background
Yankowitz was inspired and commissioned to write the play that would become Night Sky after her friend and mentor, legendary director Joseph Chaikin, suffered a stroke during heart surgery and developed aphasia.  Chaikin eventually recovered, but the experience affected him and his friends forever, and he desired to educate people about this very devastating condition.  Yankowitz recalled how "When he would go out in public—similar to what I showed in the play—people would assume he was an idiot, he didn't understand anything. For somebody of Joe's outstanding intelligence and previous eloquence, it was just a horrible situation."  Yankowitz uses these type of situations in her play.

However, Chaikin wanted to distance himself somewhat from the play, so he gave Yankowitz three conditions:  the play's protagonist was to be a woman, not a man, and he wanted the aphasia to develop due to an automobile accident instead of a stroke or surgery.  The  third condition, which surprised Yankowitz, was that the protagonist should be an astronomer.  When asked why, Chaikin replied, "'Stars, stars. So many stars.' And he made a gesture, pointing above. I said, 'Yes, but what about them?' He couldn't find the words to express it."

References

External links
 Author's Official Site
 Official Publisher
 Interview with Susan Yankowitz
 Theatre On-Line Review

1991 plays